Harland Irvin Carl (born October 1, 1931) is a former halfback in the National Football League (NFL). He played for the Chicago Bears in 1956. He played at the collegiate level at the University of Wisconsin–Madison.

See also
 List of Chicago Bears players

References

1931 births
Living people
American football halfbacks
Chicago Bears players
Wisconsin Badgers football players
People from Greenwood, Wisconsin
Players of American football from Wisconsin